Golf is an unusual sport in that television viewers can directly influence the outcome of a game by reporting rules infringements which would otherwise have been missed. Numerous golfers have been penalized at, or disqualified from, televised tournaments after a rules infringement which was not spotted by players or a referee at the time but was later noticed by a member of the public and communicated to tournament officials by phone, tweet or email. If a player has already signed their scorecard by the time such an infringement is discovered, disqualification is frequently the outcome. In April 2011, the USGA and The R&A announced a rule change which would allow players to avoid disqualification if a rules infringement was discovered after they had signed their scorecard. In December 2017, the same bodies announced a local rule change which would greatly limit the number of such incidents from 1 January 2018.

Instances of golf tournaments being influenced by television viewers

Sources

Rules of golf
Interactive television